Dimitar Georgiev (born 9 February 1992) is a Bulgarian footballer who  plays as a forward.

Career
He made his A PFG debut for Litex on 16 May 2010 against Sportist Svoge on the last day of the season, coming on as a substitute for Momchil Tsvetanov. On 14 June 2011, he signed his first professional contract with Litex. On 6 July, Dimitrov signed for Botev Vratsa on a season-long loan deal.

On 16 June 2017, Georgiev signed a 2-year contract with Dunav Ruse.  In June 2018, he moved to Montana.

Career statistics

Club

References

External links
 
 

1992 births
Living people
Bulgarian footballers
PFC Litex Lovech players
FC Botev Vratsa players
PFC Marek Dupnitsa players
PFC Slavia Sofia players
Neftochimic Burgas players
FC Pirin Razlog players
FC Lokomotiv 1929 Sofia players
FC Dunav Ruse players
FC Montana players
FC Kariana Erden players
First Professional Football League (Bulgaria) players
Second Professional Football League (Bulgaria) players
Association football midfielders
Association football forwards